Federal Route 63 is a federal road in Pahang, Malaysia, linking the town of Bukit Ibam and Bandar Muadzam Shah to the town of Bandar Baru Rompin. The road was built at the site of a defunct light railway track from Bukit Ibam to Kuala Rompin.

Route background 
The Kilometre Zero of the Federal Route 63 starts at Bukit Ibam and ends at its intersection with the Federal Route 3, the main trunk road of the east coast of Peninsular Malaysia.

History 
The Federal Route 63, together with Jalan Lanjut (Pahang State Route 110), was constructed as a light railway track by Eastern Mining & Mineral Company (EMCO) (later ROMPINCO) from Bukit Ibam to Kampung Lanjut near Kuala Rompin to transport iron ore. The construction of the railway was started in 1955 right after the state government of Pahang granted permission to EMCO to open an iron mine at Bukit Ibam. However, the railway service was short-lived and was closed down in 1960s after the iron mine was shut down. As a result, the light railway track was dismantled at the end of 1960 and was replaced by two paved roads instead (Federal Route 63 and Pahang State Route 110).

Features

At most sections, the Federal Route 63 was built under the JKR R4 road standard, allowing maximum speed limit of up to 90 km/h.

List of junctions and towns

References

Malaysian Federal Roads